(born December 7, 1970 in Tokyo, Japan) is the head athletic trainer for the Towson University football team. In 2002, Iso became the first full-time female athletic trainer in the NFL. On June 1, 2011 Ariko announced she was leaving the Steelers and returning to Oregon State University to become the head football athletic trainer for the Beavers effective June 10, 2011.

On June 6, 2018, Ariko became the Head Athletic Trainer for Towson University’s football team.

Iso became interested in athletic training after tearing her ACL while playing basketball and after hearing Oregon State University exercise physiologist Chris Zauner while in high school in Tokyo. Iso then attended Oregon State, earning her bachelor's degree in 1993. She then attended San Jose State University and earned her master's degree in 1995. She began athletic training while at San Jose State and worked at the 1994 FIFA World Cup. She was hired by Portland State University in 1996. At Portland State she worked with women's basketball, wrestling, and track and field before becoming the head football athletic trainer. In 2000 and 2001 she worked as an intern at the Steelers' training camp. She was hired by the Steelers in 2002 to fill an open position, becoming the NFL's first full-time female athletic trainer. When hired, Iso became just the third female in male professional sports, with two in the NBA. She worked at the 2005 Pro Bowl with Steelers coach Bill Cowher in Honolulu, Hawaii. As an assistant athletic trainer, Iso is responsible for reviewing applications for the team's summer program that she previously participated in. Of all the applications, Iso said she receives 100–200 from women.

References

1970 births
Living people
Oregon State University alumni
People from Tokyo
Japanese emigrants to the United States